Domingo Lim Siazon Jr. (July 9, 1939 – May 3, 2016) was a Filipino diplomat. He served as the Director-General of the United Nations Industrial Development Organization from 1985 to 1992, the 18th Philippine Secretary of Foreign Affairs from 1995 to 2001, and the Philippine Ambassador to Japan from 1993 to 1995 (1st term) and 2001 to 2010 (2nd term).

In 1976, Siazon was named Philippine ambassador to Austria, where he concurrently served as Philippine Permanent Representative to the United Nations in Vienna and to the International Atomic Energy Agency (IAEA). He was the former Secretary of Foreign Affairs of the Republic of the Philippines and Director-General of the United Nations Industrial Development Organization (UNIDO) from 1985 to 1992.

Siazon obtained his Bachelor of Arts degree in political science from the Ateneo de Manila University. He earned a second degree in Physics from the Tokyo University of Education, where he studied as a Japanese government scholar. He also has a Master of Public Administration from the John F. Kennedy School of Government, Harvard University in Massachusetts and an economics certificate from the Economic Institute of the University of Colorado. In 1997, he was conferred an award of Medal of Merit from the Philippines-Japan Society.

He was fluent in Ilocano, English, French, Spanish, Japanese, German, and Tagalog.

Siazon died on May 3, 2016, in Tokyo, Japan after a battle with prostate cancer. He was survived by his wife, Kazuko, their two children, Dan and Ken, and their grandchildren.

External links
Asiaweek interview
Biography at the Philippine Embassy in Japan

References

1939 births
2016 deaths
Ateneo de Manila University alumni
Deaths from cancer in Japan
Deaths from prostate cancer
Harvard Kennedy School alumni
Filipino diplomats
People from Cagayan
Secretaries of Foreign Affairs of the Philippines
Ambassadors of the Philippines to Austria
United Nations Industrial Development Organization people
Ambassadors of the Philippines to Japan
University of Tsukuba alumni
University of Colorado Boulder alumni
Estrada administration cabinet members
Ramos administration cabinet members